The 1937 St Pancras North by-election was held on 4 February 1937.  The by-election was held due to the resignation of the incumbent Conservative MP, Ian Fraser.  It was won by the Conservative candidate Robert Grant-Ferris.

References

St Pancras North by-election
St Pancras North,1937
St Pancras North by-election
St Pancras North,1937